Chakladar also spelled as Chaklader which means ′Head of the Chakla′, is a Bengali Surname of the people in the Indian states of West Bengal and Bangladesh (previously Bengal Presidency).

Origin and meaning

Chakla means an administrative division under the Province and dar means owner, head of something.

References 

Surnames
Bengali-language surnames
Hindu surnames
Indian surnames